Enjoy Incubus is the major label debut EP by Incubus released on January 7, 1997 by Epic Records. It contained re-recordings of songs that featured on their previous, independent releases Let Me Tell Ya 'Bout Root Beer and Fungus Amongus, as well the previously unreleased song "Version" and an untitled hidden track at the end of '"Hilikus". It was the first appearance on a release by DJ Lyfe, who added turntable scratches to the Fungus Amongus songs, and also supplied saxophone samples. This release was also noted for its introduction of 'Chuck', the mysterious mustachioed man who has become an icon for Incubus's early work. It is also the only Incubus release to feature a Parental Advisory label, despite many of their other albums also containing profanity.

Background
Enjoy Incubus marked the beginning of the band's career with Sony's Epic/Immortal label, who signed them in 1996. The EP's turntablist DJ Lyfe joined the band in late 1995. He had seen Incubus play live and asked if they would be interested in using some of his hip hop tracks; Lyfe eventually became a full-time member after just one rehearsal. The band's unique mix of styles and high-energy shows, combined with its growing fan base, was what caught the interest of Epic/Immortal, and resulted in a minor bidding war with other labels.

The EP was released in the U.S. and other countries in January 1997, with the label's strategy being to build the band's fanbase through touring rather than radio airplay. Incubus subsequently joined labelmates Korn, who were supporting their Life Is Peachy release, on a tour of Europe in early 1997. The tour was a success, and helped expose the band to a wider audience.

Track listing
"You Will Be a Hot Dancer" – 4:17
"Shaft!" – 3:25
"Take Me to Your Leader" – 4:43
"Version" – 4:17
"Azwethinkweiz" – 3:48
"Hilikus" – 18:05
An untitled hidden track (often referred to "Hidden Bonus") plays after ten minutes and two seconds of silence

Exactly 3:40 into "Azwethinkweiz", a hidden message of Boyd saying something backwards can be heard: "Thursday night, we smoked indica, and 'azwethinkweizm' was born." (see backmasking).

Personnel
Brandon of the Jungle - vocals, percussion
Dynamike - guitars
Kid Lyfe - scratches
Dirk Lance - bass
José Antonio Pasillas II - drums

References

Incubus (band) albums
1997 EPs
Epic Records EPs
Nu metal EPs